Cattleya crispata, commonly known by the synonym Laelia flava, is a species of orchid endemic to Minas Gerais, Brazil.  For registration purposes, the Royal Horticultural Society calls this species Cattleya crispata.

References

External links 

crispata
Endemic orchids of Brazil
Orchids of Minas Gerais